Panta Rei is the fifth studio album released by Serbian and former Yugoslav singer-songwriter Đorđe Balašević.

The song "Requiem" was dedicated to the late Josip Broz Tito, while the satire "Soliter" caricatures SFR Yugoslavia as a high-rise in which only the façade still holds while foundations slide.

Track listing
All the songs were written by Đorđe Balašević.
"Soliter" (High-rise) – 3:00
"Neki se rode kraj vode" (Some Are Born by the Water) – 3:42
"Oni" (They) – 3:56
"Šansona" (Chanson) – 4:53
"Nemam ništa s tim" (I Have Nothing To Do With It) – 5:35
"Starim" (I'm Growing Old) – 6:12
"Čekajući Montenegro Express" (Waiting for the Montenegro Express) – 3:35
"Jednom..." (Once...) – 4:42
"Requiem" – 5:53

References
 EX YU ROCK enciklopedija 1960–2006, Janjatović Petar;

External links
Panta Rei at Discogs

1988 albums
Đorđe Balašević albums
Jugoton albums